"Ain't Gonna Get" is a song by Australian rock band Baby Animals. It was released in April 1992 as their fifth and final single from their debut studio album Baby Animals (1991). The song peaked at number 65 on the ARIA Singles Chart.

Track listings
Australian CD single (25012)
 "Ain't Gonna Get" – 2:57
 "Rush You" (Live) – 4:18
 "Early Warning" (Live) – 4:05
 "Painless" (Live) – 4:08

 Live tracks 2, 3 & 4 recorded at Network Nine, Melbourne on 25 September 1991

Charts

External links

References

1991 songs
1992 singles
Baby Animals songs
Song recordings produced by Mike Chapman
Songs written by Suze DeMarchi